OP12 (English: On 12) was the third channel of Belgium's VRT that featured evening broadcasts. The channel was launched on May 14, 2012 and closed on December 31, 2014. The channel's name was derived from the digital channel number that the station was assigned on most digital television platforms.

History
In December 1997, the VRT's second channel was split into two distinct channels: Canvas, aimed at an intellectual audience, and Ketnet, a children's channel. Both channels were broadcast on the same frequency. Ketnet typically ran from 6 am until 8 pm, with Canvas broadcasting from 8 pm until the early hours of the morning. This setup remained in place until early 2012 when the VRT decided to extend the broadcasting hours of Canvas, to broadcast more documentaries, archival content, current affairs, and political coverage; as a result, on 1 May 2012, Canvas and Ketnet were split, with Ketnet moving to channel twelve on most television platforms.

On 14 May 2012, OP12 began evening broadcasts: these were primarily aimed at young people and expatriates living in Flanders, with cultural events and sport also being broadcast.

The aim of the third channel was also to further strengthen the public mission of the VRT. In its first year of broadcasting, the channel primarily broadcast sport and programmes aimed at young people; in the autumn of 2013 following a more comprehensive range of programming, albeit consisting largely of repeats. The OP12 name was often used in combination with some of the famous brands of the VRT; for example, concerts would often be broadcast under the name "Studio Brussel op 12" (Studio Brussel on 12), and live sports broadcasts under the name "Sporza op 12" (Sporza on 12).

Due to financial cutbacks, the VRT announced that evening broadcasts on OP12 would cease on December 31, 2014. The channel remains in use for overspill; for example, during major sporting events, and when extra programming from Eén and Canvas is broadcast, under the respective titles Een+ and Canvas+.

Programmes 
 Carte Blanche
 Fans of Flanders
 The New Generation
 De nieuwe lichting
 My Mad Fat Diary
 An Idiot Abroad - The Seven Wonders
 The Fades
 Wolven with audio description
 Buiten de zone
 dasbloghaus.tv
 De Ridder with audio description
 In Vlaamse velden with audio description
 Magazinski
 Push-it
 True Blood
 World of Jenks
 Stille Waters with audio description
 Witse with audio description

Logos

See also
 Eén
 Canvas
 Ketnet
 List of television channels in Belgium
 Sporza
 VRT

References

External links
Official site 
Gebruik van de naam OP12 - VRT-Taalnet

Television channels in Flanders
Defunct television channels in Belgium
Television channels and stations established in 2012
Television channels and stations disestablished in 2014
2012 establishments in Belgium
2014 disestablishments in Belgium